Tunney's Pasture is a  campus in the Canadian capital of Ottawa, Ontario, that is exclusively developed for federal government buildings. It is bordered by Scott Street to the south, Parkdale Avenue to the east, the Sir John A. Macdonald Parkway to the north, and the Champlain Park neighbourhood to the west. While strictly speaking it is confined to this area, people living in the vicinity of it will often call the wider neighbourhood Tunney's Pasture.

The complex is served by Tunney's Pasture station, a stop on the Transitway bus rapid transit system and the western terminus on the Confederation Line of Ottawa's O-Train light rail system.

History
Before development, this area, officially known as "Lot 35, Concession A, Township of Nepean", was used as a farmer's pasture, as the name still indicates, and named after Anthony Tunney who pastured his cows on the empty land.

As a young man, Anthony Tunney emigrated from Ireland to Ottawa in 1867 and married and built a house at 201 Parkdale Avenue. The owner of the pasture, the Ottawa Lumber Merchants' Association, hired Tunney to be the caretaker of the land and allowed him to graze his cattle in the field. Although Tunney was able to claim ownership because he had been paying the taxes on the property, he never did so. In 1947, the government expropriated the property, paying approximately $700,000 as settlement to the property owners.

In 1950, the property became part of the Greber Plan that envisioned it as a government employment centre within a quiet and secure park-like campus. From the 1950s to the 1960s, 18 low-rise buildings were constructed with modern, classical-inspired architecture and similar materials, massing, and scale. Most of these combined research and office functionality under one roof. Starting in the 1970s however, new buildings and additions were built that deviated from Gréber's vision, introducing high-rise office towers, new architectural styles, and cladding materials to the site. In 1971, Atomic Energy of Canada Limited built a SLOWPOKE-2 nuclear reactor on the site, which was moved to another site in 1984.

Little development took place in the 1990s, 2000s, and 2010s. By 2011, most buildings were considered outdated and the site under-used. Public Works and Government Services Canada has therefore initiated a plan to redevelop the campus with new high-rise buildings and mixed-use commercial and residential space over a 25-year period. In all, the plan aims to double the number of federal employees to 20,000 and add between 800 and 1000 residential units.

In 2020, modernization began with the construction of a wholly-new central heating and cooling plant that will be more energy efficient and complete with green roof. It will replace the existing one by 2025.

List of original buildings
Various ministries and agencies occupy offices, in whole or in part, in Tunney's Pasture.

Notes

References

External links 

 Ottawa K1Y Map - Tunney's Pasture, Mechanicsville, Hintonburgh, Companies, Organizations. Sorted by Streetname

Federal government buildings in Ottawa
Neighbourhoods in Ottawa